Niazi Mostafa was an Egyptian film director.

Egyptian Cinema

Egyptian movie critic Samīr Farīd wrote that Mostafa was one of "[t]he most important directors in the history of Egyptian cinema".

In 1936, he directed several promotional documentaries for Egypt Bank group companies.

Works

 Salama Is Safe or Everything is Fine (1938) - Salama fi khair
 Si Omar (1941) - Si ʿOmar
 The Wife Factory (1941) - Masnaa El-Zawgât
 Rabha (1943) - Râbha
 The Valley of Stars (1943) - Wâdî El-Negoum
 Hababa (1944) - Habâbah
 Hassan and Hassan (1944) - Hassan we Hassan
 The Magic Cap (1944) - Tâeyyet El-Ekhfaʾ
 Mohamed-Ali Street (1944) - Share' Mohamed ʻAlî
 My Daughter (1944) - Ibnatî
 Antar and Abla (1945) - ʿAntar we Abla
 The Human Being (1945) - El-Banî âdam
 Miss Boussa (1945) - El-Ânisah Boussah
 Son of the East (1945) - Egyptian-Iraqi co-production - Ibn El-Chark, Le fils de l'Orient
 A Glass and a Cigarette or Sigarra we Kas (1955)
A Scrap of Bread (1960) - Loqmat Al-Aish
 The Most Dangerous Man in the World (1967) - Akhtar ragol fil alam
 Pleasure and Suffering (1971)
 Without Pity (1971) - Bela Rahma
 Searching for a Scandal (1973) - El Bahs Ann fediha
 A Girl Named Maĥmood (1975)
 Hereditary Madness (1975) - Magânîn bi-l-wirâthah
 The Delinquents (1976) - El-Mounharifoun
 First Year of Love (1976) - Sanah oula houbb - Co-directed by Mostafa, Salah Abou Seif, Atef Salem, Kamal al-Cheikh, and Helmi Rafla

References
 Armes, Roy. Dictionary of African Filmmakers. Indiana University Press, July 11, 2008. , 9780253000422.

Notes

External links
 

Film directors from Cairo
Year of birth missing
Place of birth missing
Year of death missing